Sir David William Cross MacMillan  (born 16 March 1968) is a Scottish chemist and the James S. McDonnell Distinguished University Professor of Chemistry at Princeton University, where he was also the chair of the Department of Chemistry from 2010 to 2015. He shared the 2021 Nobel Prize in Chemistry with Benjamin List "for the development of asymmetric organocatalysis".

Education and early life
MacMillan was born in Bellshill in North Lanarkshire, Scotland, in 1968 and grew up in nearby New Stevenston. He attended the local state-funded schools, New Stevenston Primary and Bellshill Academy, and credited his Scottish education and Scottish upbringing for his success. He received his undergraduate degree in chemistry at the University of Glasgow, where he worked with Ernie Colvin.

In 1990, he left the UK to begin his doctoral studies under the direction of Professor Larry Overman at the University of California, Irvine. During this time, he focused on the development of new reaction methodology directed toward the stereocontrolled formation of bicyclic tetrahydrofurans. MacMillan's graduate studies culminated in the total synthesis of  acetate, a eunicellin diterpenoid isolated from the soft coral Eunicella stricta. He earned his Ph.D. in 1996.

Career and research
Upon receiving his Ph.D., MacMillan accepted a position with Professor David Evans at Harvard University. His postdoctoral studies centered on enantioselective catalysis, in particular, the design and development of Sn(II)-derived bisoxazoline complexes (Sn(II)box).

MacMillan began his independent research career as a member of the chemistry faculty at the University of California, Berkeley in July 1998. He joined the department of chemistry at Caltech in June 2000, where his group's research interests centered on new approaches to enantioselective catalysis. In 2004, he was appointed as the Earle C. Anthony Professor of Chemistry. He became the James S. McDonnell Distinguished University Professor at Princeton University in September 2006.

He is considered to be one of the founders of organocatalysis. In 2000, MacMillan designed small organic molecules that can provide or accept electrons and therefore efficiently catalyse reactions. He developed catalysts that can drive asymmetric catalysis, in which a reaction produces more of the left-handed version of a molecule than the right-handed one (chirality), or vice versa. MacMillan's research group has made many advances in the field of asymmetric organocatalysis, and they have applied these new methods to the synthesis of a range of complex natural products. He developed chiral imidazolidinone catalysts.  are used in various asymmetric syntheses. Examples include Diels-Alder reactions, 1,3-dipolar cycloadditions, Friedel-Crafts alkylations or Michael additions.

MacMillan has also extensively developed photoredox catalysis for use in organic synthesis.

Between 2010 and 2014, MacMillan was the founding editor-in-chief of the journal Chemical Science, the flagship general chemistry journal published by the Royal Society of Chemistry.

, MacMillan has an h-index of 110 according to Google Scholar and of 100 according to Scopus.

Honours and awards
MacMillan was knighted in the 2022 Birthday Honours for services to chemistry and science.

2002 Sloan Research Fellowship
2004 Corday-Morgan medal of Royal Institute of Chemistry
2012 Elected a Fellow of the Royal Society (FRS)
2012 Elected as a member of the American Academy of Arts and Sciences
2013 Elected a Corresponding Fellow of the Royal Society of Edinburgh (FRSE)
2015 Harrison Howe Award
2017 Ryoji Noyori Prize
2018 Elected a member of the National Academy of Sciences
2021 Nobel Prize in Chemistry

List
 List of Nobel laureates affiliated with Princeton University
 List of Nobel laureates

References

External links

 
 

1968 births
Living people
People educated at Bellshill Academy
Alumni of the University of Glasgow
University of California, Irvine alumni
Fellows of the American Academy of Arts and Sciences
Fellows of the Royal Society
Members of the United States National Academy of Sciences
Nobel laureates in Chemistry
Organic chemists
Princeton University faculty
Scottish chemists
20th-century British chemists
21st-century British chemists
UC Berkeley College of Chemistry faculty
Scottish Nobel laureates
British Nobel laureates
Knights Bachelor
People from North Lanarkshire
Scottish expatriates in the United States